The tawny-capped euphonia (Euphonia anneae) is a species of bird in the family Fringillidae.
It is found in Colombia, Costa Rica, and Panama.
Its natural habitats are subtropical or tropical moist lowland forest, subtropical or tropical moist montane forest, and heavily degraded former forest.

References

tawny-capped euphonia
Birds of Costa Rica
Birds of Panama
tawny-capped euphonia
Taxonomy articles created by Polbot